Elections to Knowsley Metropolitan Borough Council were held on 2 May 2002.  One third of the council was up for election and the Labour Party kept overall control of the council.  Overall turnout was 23.7%.

After the election, the composition of the council was:
Labour 59
Liberal Democrat 7

Election result

Ward results

References

2002
2002 English local elections
2000s in Merseyside